Castnia juturna is a moth of the Castniidae family. It is known from Brazil and Paraguay.

Castniidae
Moths described in 1856